Technomyrmex bicolor is a species of dolichoderine ant first described from Sri Lanka in 1893. 

The species is also found in China.

References

External links

 at antwiki.org

Dolichoderinae
Hymenoptera of Asia
Household pest insects
Insects described in 1893